Philip Andelman is an American music video director and photographer. Andelman has directed music videos for many notable artists, see below. He has received nominations for his works from the MVPA, VMAs, and CMT awards including MVPA Director of the Year. His commercial work has won a Bronze Clio Award.

Early life
He grew up in Kenya, Paris, and New York City. Andelman attended Phillips Exeter Academy. Andelman was involved in filming since age 10. During his junior year in high school, he started interning with photographer Annie Leibovitz. He received a film degree from New York University. His photographic works have been exhibited at Milk Gallery. He is married and has at least one child.

Career
While at NYU, Andelman directed a 15-minute short film entitled "Looking for Actionman".  The film won a grant from director Martin Scorsese. Interning with Annie Leibovitz lead Andelman to become the official photographer for The Grateful Dead. In 2011, Andelman released his first book with the Beastie Boys. Andelman left New York after graduating from NYU to shop a script in Los Angeles. He characterized it as "the worst script ever written" and said "he couldn't even get a meeting".
Andelman worked as a 2nd unit director and cinematographer under director Joseph Kahn.

Working with Kahn was a fortuitous experience, as he went from working as a production assistant to 2nd unit director in the course of a single month. During that time as a 2nd unit director, beginning in the summer of 2000, he worked on over 20 music videos including ones for "Elevation", "South Side", and "Hero" Andelman followed Lenny Kravitz during 2002, shooting a documentary/concert film with colleague Mark Seliger.  Andelman went on to direct music videos for Kravitz's album Baptism. He also directed Kravitz's campaign for Kohl's. His other commercial works have included videos for Warby Parker, Target, and Verizon.

Music videos

References

External links 
 Official Web Site
 Twitter Page

American music video directors
Living people
Year of birth missing (living people)
Phillips Exeter Academy alumni
New York University alumni